Taste were an Australian band, active in the 1970s, and was originally called Cloud Nine. 

The band consisted of Ken Murdoch (guitars, vocals and keyboards), Michael Gemini (bass), Joey Amenta and Virgil Donati (drums).

In 1975, the group changed their name to Taste.

As Taste, the group released two studio album which peaked inside the Australian top 20.

Biography

1970-1975: Cloud 9
In 1970, Ken Murdoch and Michael Tortoni formed Cloud 9 (aka Cloud Nine) while still at high school. Cloud 9 issued a debut single on Warner Records, called "Say Goodbye" produced by Ian Molly Meldrum in 1973. In 1974, Virgil Donati and Tony Farrimond (vocals) joined and the band signed to RCA.

Cloud 9 released the album We're Just Good Friends… So Rock On and the singles "Summertime Blues" and "Take My Hand".

In 1975, Joey Amenta replaced Farrimond and the band changed their name to Taste. At the end of the year, the band signed to the Bootleg label.

1976-1979: Taste
In June 1976, the band released "Tickle Your Fancy" / "Rock 'n' Roll Superstar", which peaked at number 18 on the Australian charts. Taste's debut album Tickle Your Fancy was released in July 1976 and peaked at number 19.The group's biggest hit came with "Boys Will Be Boys", which peaked at number 14 in January 1977. "A Little Romance" was followed by "Rebecca" proceeding the band's second album Knights of Love in September 1977.

2005-present
The band re-formed in the mid 2000s and recorded album Rock is Dead.

Damian Corniola joined the group and together the group released Life On Earth.

In 2020, they released the EP Brothers Vol 1 which included "We All Stand Up" which garnered over 136 radio station add lists and the single "2020s Gone" which charted at No.6 in Madrid.

Discography

Albums

Studio albums

Compilations

Extended plays

Singles

References

Australian pop music groups
Musical groups established in 1970
Musical groups disestablished in 1978